Sofia Rusova, (18 February 1856 – 5 February 1940) was a Ukrainian pedagogue, author, women's rights advocate, and political activist.

Early life 
Sofia Lindfors-Rusova was born in the small village of Oleshnia, Chernigov Governorate, a part of the Russian Empire at the time that is now in Koriukivka Raion, Chernihiv Oblast, Ukraine. Her father, Fedir Lindfors, was of Baltic nobility, and her mother, Hanna Gervais, was of French descent. The everyday languages in the Lindfors household were Russian and French. Rusova was a child when her ten-year-old sister, Natalia, and six-year-old brother, Volodymyr, died.  Her mother contracted tuberculosis and died soon after. Rusova's older sister, Maria, barely a teenager, stepped in to fill the role of mother. The family moved to Kyiv when Rusova was ten years old, and there Rusova completed the Fundukleiev Gymnasium.

Educator 
Rusova is recognized as a prominent pedagogue and an advocate for national education. 

In 1871 Rusova’s father died, leaving Rusova, her 27-year-old sister Maria and 31-year-old brother Oleksander orphaned. Soon after, Rusova and her sister Maria moved in together. There were no existing kindergartens in Kyiv, and the sisters set out to study early childhood education and to eventually open a kindergarten. In 1872, they opened Kyiv's first kindergarten.

Political activist 
By the 1800s, the political and military institutions of Ukraine had been dismantled by the Russian Empire. Ukrainians were labeled “Little Russians” and treated as subordinates. Ukraine was reduced to provincial status. By the late 1800s the Russian Empire was promoting a fierce anti-Ukrainian sentiment. The imperial regime under Tsar Alexander II issued the Ems Ukaz, which outlawed the use of the Ukrainian language in print. The Ukrainian intelligentsia was determined to publish Taras Shevchenko’s complete Kobzar in two volumes, including the parts of the text that had been censored and were virtually unknown in Ukraine. Rusova and her husband, Oleksander Rusov, spent time in Prague preparing the text for publication. Fedir Vovk, an anthropologist and archeologist, furnished Shevchenko’s manuscripts that he had purchased from Shevchenko's brothers with money donated by wealthy Ukrainians. At great personal risk, the couple brought the complete, published Kobzar back to Ukraine.

The Rusov couple was exiled to St. Petersburg more than once for their civic and political activity. Rusova was arrested and imprisoned on several occasions for her “revolutionary” views and writing. In 1917 she became a member of the Central Council of Ukraine. Rusova served in the Department of Preschool and Adult Education in the Ministry of Education. She was professor of education at the Froebel Pedagogical Institute in Kyiv before the First World War and at Kamyanets-Podilsky National University after the war. Rusova was a founding member and first president of the National Council of Ukrainian Women. She served as the representative of Ukrainian women at several international women’s conferences.

Legacy 
Rusova promoted daycare, continuing education, human rights, and the political organization of the peasants. She escaped from Soviet Ukraine in 1922 and settled in Prague, where she taught at the Ukrainian Higher Pedagogical Institute between 1924 and 1939. She died in Prague at the age of 84 and was buried at the Olsanske Cemetery.

In 2016 a commemorative coin was minted in Ukraine in honor of the 160th anniversary of Rusova's birth. A monument was installed on the school grounds in the town of Ripky. The Sofia Rusova School in Oleshnia, where Rusova was born, houses a modest museum and hosts scholarly workshops dedicated to Rusova.

References 

1856 births
1940 deaths
Ukrainian women's rights activists
Ukrainian women writers
20th-century Ukrainian women politicians
Ukrainian people in the Russian Empire
Hromada (society) members